Serena Williams defeated her sister Venus Williams in the final, 7–6(7–4), 3–6, 6–4 to win the women's singles tennis title at the 2003 Australian Open. It was her fourth consecutive major singles triumph, completing the "Serena Slam", both a non-calendar year Grand Slam and the career Grand Slam. It was also Venus' record fourth consecutive runner-up finish at a major, losing every final to Serena. Serena saved two match points en route to the title, against Kim Clijsters in the semifinals (where at one point in the third set Serena was 1–5 down).

Jennifer Capriati was the two-time defending champion, but lost to Marlene Weingärtner in the first round. Capriati's loss marked the first time the defending Australian Open champion lost in the first round, and the first time at any major that the defending champion lost in the first round since Steffi Graf at the 1994 Wimbledon Championships. With Lindsay Davenport's defeat in the fourth round, a first-time Australian Open champion was guaranteed.

This tournament marked the first Australian Open final without Martina Hingis since 1996. It was also the final appearance of four-time champion Monica Seles, who lost to Klára Koukalová in the second round.

This marked the first major appearance of two future world No. 1's: five-time major champion Maria Sharapova and Jelena Janković, who lost to Klára Koukalová and Amanda Coetzer in the first and second rounds respectively. It was also the major main draw debut of future US Open champion Flavia Pennetta, who lost to Silvia Farina Elia in the first round.

Seeds

Qualifying

Draw

Finals

Top half

Section 1

Section 2

Section 3

Section 4

Bottom half

Section 5

Section 6

Section 7

Section 8

Other entry information

Wild cards

Protected ranking

Qualifiers

Withdrawals

External links
 2003 Australian Open – Women's draws and results at the International Tennis Federation

Women's singles
Australian Open (tennis) by year – Women's singles
2003 in Australian women's sport